The suburb of Bexley is situated in East Christchurch on the west bank of the Avon River approximately one kilometre from the Avon Heathcote Estuary.  It is enclosed within a bend in the Avon River and borders the suburb of Aranui.

Geography
Bexley is one of the eastern suburbs. Its eastern boundary is the Avon River. Boundary roads are Pages Road in the north, Shuttle Drive in the west, and Cuthberts Road, Breezes Road and Bridge Street in the south. Bexley was substantially damaged in the February 2011 earthquake, with approximately 90% of homes in the area needing to be demolished, mostly due to the effects of liquefaction, and placed in a residential red zone. Much of the suburb is now recreational open space. Aranui is located to the north of Pages Road.

Description

Bexley is best known for its wetlands which in recent years have been developed for housing and also a wildlife preserve.  There are a number of walkways along the Avon River and through the Bexley wetlands area.

Bexley is considered a High Risk Flood Zone.  The Avon River can carry around 30% of Christchurch's Storm water discharge and many parts of Bexley are threatened by the combination of high tides and flooding.  New homes and significant changes to older homes require an increase to either the floor level and/or the ground level.

Housing in Bexley is a mix of styles mainly from the early 1960s onward.   Recent developments around wetland areas have seen large growth in new medium-sized bungalow style houses since the late 1990s.  And most usable property will be built on by late 2007.  There has been consistent activity in subdividing larger older properties since the late 1970s which is expected to continue well in to the future.

Other recent changes include the linking of Anzac Drive and Bexley Road to complete the Christchurch East Ring Road to the port of Lyttelton.

Earthquake damage 

In the earthquake of September 2010 over 100 houses in the suburb were rendered uninhabitable by silt and subsidence due to soil liquefaction.

Flooding from soil liquefaction again caused serious flooding, and damaged roads and services in February 2011 from the 2011 Christchurch earthquake.

In June 2011 the government announced that for a number of areas in Christchurch "There is significant and extensive area wide land damage; The success of engineering solutions may be uncertain in terms of design, its success and possible commencement, given the ongoing seismic activity; and, Any repair would be disruptive and protracted for landowners."  As a result, the government offered to purchase the properties owned in this and similar areas for their pre-quake rateable value. Bexley and other affected areas have been classified as part of Christchurch's residential red zone.

Demographics

Bexley had a population of 2,553 at the 2018 New Zealand census, an increase of 309 people (13.8%) since the 2013 census, and a decrease of 12 people (-0.5%) since the 2006 census. There were 903 households. There were 1,305 males and 1,248 females, giving a sex ratio of 1.05 males per female. The median age was 35.5 years (compared with 37.4 years nationally), with 522 people (20.4%) aged under 15 years, 588 (23.0%) aged 15 to 29, 1,131 (44.3%) aged 30 to 64, and 312 (12.2%) aged 65 or older.

Ethnicities were 75.3% European/Pākehā, 24.8% Māori, 13.0% Pacific peoples, 5.3% Asian, and 1.9% other ethnicities (totals add to more than 100% since people could identify with multiple ethnicities).

The proportion of people born overseas was 14.1%, compared with 27.1% nationally.

Although some people objected to giving their religion, 54.5% had no religion, 32.0% were Christian, 0.6% were Hindu, 0.4% were Muslim, 0.4% were Buddhist and 2.9% had other religions.

Of those at least 15 years old, 129 (6.4%) people had a bachelor or higher degree, and 681 (33.5%) people had no formal qualifications. The median income was $27,100, compared with $31,800 nationally. The employment status of those at least 15 was that 978 (48.2%) people were employed full-time, 255 (12.6%) were part-time, and 123 (6.1%) were unemployed.

References 

Suburbs of Christchurch